This is a list of symphonies in F minor written by notable composers.

References

See also
For Symphonies in F major, see List of symphonies in F major. For symphonies in other keys, see List of symphonies by key.

F minor
Symphonies